Antonio Conte (11 December 1867 — 4 February 1953) was an Italian fencer who competed in the late 19th century and early 20th century.

Biography
Conte was born in Minturno. He participated in Fencing at the 1900 Summer Olympics in Paris and won the gold medal in the masters sabre, defeating fellow Italian fencer Italo Santelli in the final.

References

External links
 
 

1867 births
1953 deaths
Sportspeople from the Province of Latina
Italian male fencers
Olympic fencers of Italy
Fencers at the 1900 Summer Olympics
Olympic gold medalists for Italy
Olympic medalists in fencing
Medalists at the 1900 Summer Olympics
20th-century Italian people